The following is a list of things named for Henry Clay, including monuments and memorials in his honor.

Roads
clays springs rd lexington, ky
 Henry Clay Avenue in New Orleans
 Henry Clay Boulevard and Clay Avenue in Lexington, Kentucky
 Henry Clay Boulevard in Ashland, Missouri
 Clay Streets in numerous cities, including New Haven, Connecticut, Richmond, Virginia, Vicksburg, Mississippi and Whitefish Bay, Wisconsin.
 Ashland Ave. in Chicago, Illinois; Ashland, Virginia, Ashland County in Ohio and Wisconsin were named for his estate, as were the cities of Ashland in Kentucky, Alabama, and Pennsylvania.
 Henry Clay Court in The Landings on Skidaway Island, Georgia

Towns
 Ashland, Missouri, was named after Clay's Lexington, Kentucky estate, as was Ashland, Massachusetts.
 Clay,  in Onondaga County, New York, including the road Henry Clay Boulevard.  Also, Clayville in Oneida County, New York.
 Clay, Kentucky in western Kentucky is named in honor of Clay.
 Clay, West Virginia is named for Henry Clay.
 Clay City, Indiana is named for Henry Clay.
 Henry Clay Village, or Breck's Mill Area, on the left bank of Brandywine Creek in Wilmington, Delaware, factory and mill worker's residences.
 The town of Claysburg in central Pennsylvania is named in honor of Clay.
 Clay, New York, a suburb of Syracuse, is named after Henry Clay.
Clayville, New York a town named after Clay during the late 1800s, a highly popular area with mills and factories.
 Clayville, Illinois was an active settlement during the statesman's life.
 Claysville, Alabama is named in honor of Clay.
 Clay-Ashland, Liberia is named after Henry Clay and his estate Ashland in Lexington, Kentucky.

Counties
 Sixteen Clay counties in the United States, in Alabama, Florida, Georgia, Illinois, Indiana, Kansas, Kentucky, Minnesota, Mississippi, Missouri, Nebraska, North Carolina, South Dakota, Tennessee, Texas, and West Virginia. (Clay County, Iowa is named for his son Henry Clay Jr.)

Monuments

 Memorial column and statue at his tomb in Lexington, Kentucky
 Statue of Clay in the National Statuary Hall Collection, Capitol, Washington D.C.
 Henry Clay statue and portrait in Virginia State Capitol in Richmond, Virginia
 Henry Clay monument in Pottsville, Pennsylvania
 In New Orleans, a 20-foot-tall monument was erected in 1860 at Canal Street and St. Charles Avenue/Royal Street, and moved to the center of Lafayette Square in 1901.
 Clay is one of the many senators honored with a cenotaph in the Congressional Cemetery.

Schools 

 Clay Elementary in Rolando, San Diego
 Clay High School in South Bend, Indiana
 Henry Clay Elementary School in the Hegewisch neighborhood in Chicago
 Henry Clay Elementary School in his birthplace Ashland, Virginia.
 Henry Clay High School in Lexington, Kentucky, 
 Henry Clay Middle School in Los Angeles
 Henry Clay School in Whitefish Bay, Wisconsin
 The Instituto Educacional Henry Clay in Caracas, Venezuela, a bilingual private school
 The Clay Dormitory at Transylvania University in Lexington, Kentucky

Parks 

 Clay Neighborhood Park in Rolando, San Diego
 In 2020, a Henry Clay Park in Arlington, Virginia was renamed Zitkala-Ša Park during a wave of name changes in the aftermath of the Murder of George Floyd.
 Cooper's Rock State Forest in West Virginia features a preserved nineteenth century iron furnace named in commemoration of Henry Clay.

Other
 Mount Clay in the Presidential Range of New Hampshire was named for Clay, since renamed Mount Reagan by the state legislature but not by the federal Board on Geographic Names
 The Lafayette class submarine USS Henry Clay (SSBN-625). 
 Between 1870 and 1908, Clay was included in the pantheon of Great Americans presented on U. S. definitive postage stamps: he appeared on the 12¢ denomination in the issues of 1870, 1873 and 1879 and on the 15¢ denomination in the issues of 1890, 1894, 1898 and 1902. He has since been honored by the United States Postal Service with a 3¢ Great Americans series postage stamp.
 The Henry Clay, an historic residential building in downtown Louisville, Kentucky, formerly the city's YWCA building.

References

Clay, Henry
Clay, Henry place names
Clay